Anna-Liisa Hirviluoto ( February 16, 1929 – April 23, 2000) was a Finnish archaeologist. She made her career in the Finnish National Board of Antiquities and its predecessor, the Archaeological Commission positions for 35 years.

Her research specialty was Iron Age excavations like her work at the Turku (Kaarina) Ristimäki site in 1962. In addition, as part of her duties, Hirviluoto oversaw the country's road construction projects to ensure that road routes neither threatened protected areas of the Antiquities Act nor the wider environmental management. Under her leadership, archival records were compiled and regional planning units began to publish lists of protected sites.

Published works
 "Raision Ihalan 'vaskivaipat'" Suomen Muinaismuistoyhdistys, Vol 75, (1973), pp 60–67 (in Finnish)
 Iron Age cultivation in SW Finland (with Kimmo Tolonen and Ari Siiriäinen) Helsinki: Finska fornminnesföreningen, (1979) (in English)
 Hollolan kirkko: asutuksen, kirkon ja seurakunnan historiaa Hollola: Hollolan seurakunta, (1985) (in Finnish)
 Iron Age Studies in Salo 1/2: 1: The research History of the Isokylä Area in Salo (with Marianne Schaumann-Lönquis, Elvi Linturi, Pirjo Uino, et al.)  Helsinki: Vammalan Kirjapaino, (1986) (in English)
 Salon esihistoria Salo: Salon Kaupunki, (1991) (in Finnish)
 Halikon historia 1 (with Kari Pitkänen) Halikko: Halikon Kunta, (1992) (in Finnish)
 Rapolan muinaislinna (with Katriina Koskinen and Voipaalan taidekeskus) Valkeakoski: Voipaalan taidekeskus, (1993) (in Finnish)

References

External links
 World Cat

1929 births
2000 deaths
Writers from Helsinki
Finnish archaeologists
20th-century Finnish women writers
20th-century Finnish writers
Finnish women academics
Finnish women archaeologists
20th-century archaeologists